Patrick Buckland is a British video game programmer, designer and chief executive officer of Stainless Games, which he co-founded with Neil Barnden in 1994.

Career
Buckland is a video games pioneer, having been in the industry since 1982.

Crystal Quest
In 1985 Buckland developed one of the first Macintosh games, the shareware title Crystal Raider. A year after the game's release, Buckland decided to work on a follow up, Crystal Quest, which would take the gameplay of its predecessor, and add new features. The game ended up ported to numerous other platforms, including the Apple IIgs, Amiga, Nintendo Game Boy, Palm and much later, PC and Xbox 360.

Stainless Software
In 1993, Along with Neil Barnden, Buckland started up Stainless Software "in order to concentrate on games". Among their first clients was Argonaut Games, who contracted the team to work on 3D engine development. Two years later, in 1995, the company landed their first games contract, with British publisher SCi, after pitching a title called "3D Destruction Derby" in 1994. Originally, the game was intended by the publisher to be a licensed Mad Max title, but SCi couldn't get their hands on the licence. Next, in anticipation of a sequel to the cult 1975 film Death Race 2000, the game was titled Death Race 2020.

The film sequel fell through, and it was decided to just do it without the license. Carmageddon was released in mid 1997 – using the BRender engine – and immediately topped the UK games charts, with other charts worldwide following suit soon after.

VIS entertainment
In 1999 the company was absorbed into Scottish based developer VIS Entertainment. Most notable among the many projects that Buckland worked on as part of VIS was 2001's State of Emergency (video game), which saw him attached to the game midway through development as executive director and design consultant. In 2001 a rally project at VIS for Electronic Arts was cancelled, and VIS began restructuring itself. As part of this process, Patrick Buckland spun-off Stainless Games as an independent company again, which was financed by Les Edgar, founder of Bullfrog and ex-chairman of VIS.

Stainless Games
Stainless Games remains independent to this day, and is based in Newport on the Isle of Wight. The company has released a number of titles, including a port of Crystal Quest, Scrabble 2007 edition, Red Baron, Happy Tree Friends: False Alarm, Warlords, Tempest, Battlezone, Asteroids, Missile Command, Centipede & Millipede, Novadrome, RISK: Factions, Carmageddon: Max Damage and most notable Magic: The Gathering – Duels of the Planeswalkers.

He was wholly or partly responsible for the production of videogames such as Crystal Quest, Carmageddon, Carmageddon II: Carpocalypse Now, Carmageddon: Reincarnation and Magic: The Gathering – Duels of the Planeswalkers. He also produced a range of non-game software over the years, including AME, a security system used by (amongst others) the CIA and NASA, Crash Barrier, a crash recovery utility for the Macintosh, a Teletext authoring system, CAD software for the marine industry, retail packaging CAD systems, LeLisp for the French government, Structured BASIC or the Apple // and various other software packages.

Games
Games and other major products produced by or including code written by Buckland include
Structured Basic (Apple II) – UMicro
Liberator (Apple II) – Thorn EMI
Submarine Commander (Apple II) – Thorn EMI
MacCharlie (Mac) – Dayna Communications
LeLisp (Mac) – ACT Informatique
Crystal Raider (Mac) – Shareware
Crystal Quest (Mac/Amiga/GS/DS/PocketPC/Palm/Mobile/XBLA) – Casady & Greene/Infinite Ventures/HandsOn/Stainless
Telewriter (Mac) – Teletext
Nest (Mac) – ICS
Axxon (Mac) – Axxon
Sky Shadow (Mac) – Casady & Greene
Crash Barrier (Mac) – Casady & Greene
AME (Mac) – Casady & Greene
Crystal Crazy (Mac) – Casady & Greene
Mercury (Mac) – Aaron
Medical reference multimedia (PC) – Times Mirror Group
BRender (Mac + PC Demo software etc.) – Argonaut
Carmageddon (PC/Mac) – SCi
Carmageddon: Splat Pack (PC) – SCi
Carmageddon II: Carpocalypse Now (PC/Mac) – SCi
State of Emergency (PS2) – Rockstar Games
Novadrome (XBLA) – Stainless/Disney
Pocket Bike Racer (Xbox/X360) – Blitz
Centipede (XBLA)/Millipede (XBLA) – Atari
Missile Command (XBLA) – Atari
Asteroids (XBLA)/Asteroids Deluxe (XBLA) – Atari
Happy Tree Friends: False Alarm (XBLA) – Sega
Tempest (XBLA) – Atari
Warlords (XBLA) – Atari
Battlezone (XBLA) – Atari
Atari Classics (PSP) – Atari
Red Baron (PC/PS3-PSN) – Sierra Online
Scrabble (DS/PSP – EA version) – EA
Magic: The Gathering - Duels of the Planeswalkers various versions, 2009-2017 (Xbox 360, Xbox One, PC, PS3, PS4, iOS, Android) – Wizards of the Coast
Risk: Factions (XBLA) – EA
Carmageddon: Reincarnation (PC) – Stainless Games self-published
Carmageddon: Max Damage – (PC, PS4 & Xbox One) Stainless Games self-published
Carmageddon: Crashers (iOS & Android) – Stainless Games self-published

The above list excludes a number of cancelled projects (some of which were major and near completion), minor contract work, and confidential projects.

Crystal Quest received a number of awards when released on the Mac in 1987, as did Carmageddon and Carmageddon II in 1997 and 1998 respectively. Magic: The Gathering – Duels of the Planeswalkers broke all sales records on the XBLA platform when it was released in June 2009, although these records were broken again by other titles shortly afterward.

Other interests
In 2013, Buckland was one of a consortium of British individuals who bought the rights back to the sports car manufacturer TVR, from Nikolay Smolensky. The new company, TVR Manufacturing Ltd, is already taking deposits for an all-new vehicle developed in conjunction with Gordon Murray and Cosworth.

Personal life
He was born in London and moved to the Isle of Wight at the age of 2. Buckland still lives on the Isle of Wight with his wife and two children and is a direct descendant of renowned geologist/palaeontologist William Buckland and his son, renowned zoologist Frank Buckland.

References

External links
 Stainless Games website
 "Playing Catch Up: Stainless Games' Patrick Buckland", Alistair Wallis Gamasutra, 14 December 2006
 

Year of birth missing (living people)
British technology chief executives
British video game designers
British video game programmers
Living people